Delta Museum may refer to:

 Delta Blues Museum, a blues museum in Clarksdale, Mississippi
 Delta Flight Museum, an aviation museum in Atlanta, Georgia
 Musée Delta, an aviation museum in Athis-Mons, France